Panforte is a traditional chewy Italian dessert containing fruits and nuts. It is similar to a florentine but much thicker, or a little like a lebkuchen. Known throughout all Italy, it is a Christmas tradition associated most especially with the Province of Siena.

History 
Panforte dates back at least to the 13th century, in the Italian region of Tuscany. Documents from 1205, conserved in the State Archive of Siena, attest that bread flavored with pepper and honey (panes melati et pepati) was paid to the local monks and nuns of the monastery of Montecellesi (modern Monte Celso, near Fontebecci) as a tax or tithe which was due on 7 February that year.

Literally, panforte means "strong bread", derived from the Latin , which refers to the spicy flavour. Originally the Sienese called it "panpepato" (peppered bread), due to the strong pepper used. The original dessert was composed of wheat flour, honey, spices, dried figs, jam, pine nuts and was flavored with pepper.

Production 
The process of making panforte is fairly simple. Sugar is dissolved in honey and various nuts, fruits and spices are mixed together with flour. The entire mixture is baked in a shallow pan. The finished disc is dusted with icing sugar. Commercially produced panforte often have a band of rice-paper around the edge.

Currently there are many shops in Italy that produce panforte, each recipe being their own jealously guarded interpretation of the original confection and packaged in distinctive wrapping. Usually a small wedge is served with coffee or a dessert wine after a meal, though some enjoy it with their coffee at breakfast.

In Siena—which is regarded by many, if not most inhabitants of that city, as the panforte capital of Italy—it is sometimes said that panforte should properly contain seventeen different ingredients, seventeen being the number of Contrade within the city walls.

Protected geographical indication 
In 2013 Panforte received the Protected geographical indication (PGI) of the Geographical indications and traditional specialities in the European Union.

References

External links

 Panforte Di Siena—history

Cuisine of Tuscany
Italian desserts
Nut confections
Christmas food
Italian products with protected designation of origin